Edson Luiz da Silva (born 15 March 1977) is a Brazilian former professional footballer who played as left-back, who could also adapt to play in midfield.

Career
During his brief spell at Marseille he played in the 1999 UEFA Cup Final.

In the summer of 2005, Edson signed for Lisbon side Sporting CP, after three seasons with União de Leiria where his side reach the final of the Taça de Portugal and the Supertaça Cândido de Oliveira. In January 2006, after making only one league appearance with the Leões, Edson was loaned out to Polish side Legia Warsaw where he would help his side win the Ekstraklasa.

He quickly made a name for himself in the Ekstraklasa, scoring some impressive goals from free-kicks. However, he was unable to maintain his form and he was eventually dropped in favor of Grzegorz Bronowicki. However, in the 2007–08 season Bronowicki's was sold to Crvena Zvezda Belgrad and new manager of Legia Warsaw, Jan Urban moved Edson to the midfield and he reclaimed his place in first eleven. He then lost his place again to 18-year-old Maciej Rybus.

On 1 August 2009, he moved to Polish Ekstraklasa side Korona Kielce. On 9 August he made his debut for his new club in a match against Lech Poznań.

Honours
Sport
 Campeonato Pernambucano: 1998, 1999
 Copa Pernambuco: 1998

Marseille
 UEFA Cup: Runner-up 1998–99

Corinthians
 FIFA Club World Cup: 2000
 Campeonato Paulista: 2001
 Copa do Brasil: 2002

União de Leiria
 Taça de Portugal: Runner-up 2002–03
 Supertaça Cândido de Oliveira: Runner-up 2003

Legia Warsaw
 Ekstraklasa: 2005–06
 Polish Cup: 2007–08
 Polish SuperCup: 2008, Runner-up 2006
 Ekstraklasa Cup: Runner-up 2008

Santa Cruz
 Copa Pernambuco: 2010

References

External links
 

1977 births
Living people
Sportspeople from Pernambuco
Brazilian footballers
Association football defenders
Campeonato Brasileiro Série A players
Sport Club do Recife players
Ligue 1 players
Olympique de Marseille players
Sport Club Corinthians Paulista players
Clube Atlético Mineiro players
Primeira Liga players
U.D. Leiria players
Sporting CP footballers
Ekstraklasa players
Legia Warsaw players
Clube Náutico Capibaribe players
Korona Kielce players
Santa Cruz Futebol Clube players
Brazilian expatriate footballers
Expatriate footballers in France
Brazilian expatriate sportspeople in France
Expatriate footballers in Portugal
Brazilian expatriate sportspeople in Portugal
Expatriate footballers in Poland
Brazilian expatriate sportspeople in Poland